Trifurcula austriaca is a moth of the family Nepticulidae. It is found in Austria, the Czech Republic and Slovakia. It has also been reported from Greece.

The wingspan is 5.6-6.7 mm for males. Adults were found from May to September in a grassland nature reserve.

External links
The Trifurcula Subnitidella Group (Lepidoptera: Nepticulidae): Taxonomy, Distribution and Biology
Fauna Europaea

Nepticulidae
Moths of Europe
Moths described in 1990